Richard Gasquet was the defending champion but chose not to defend his title.

Guido Andreozzi won the title after defeating Alejandro Davidovich Fokina 6–4, 4–6, 6–3 in the final.

Seeds

Draw

Finals

Top half

Bottom half

References
Main Draw
Qualifying Draw

Pekao Szczecin Open - Singles
2018 Singles